The Jetsons is an American animated sitcom produced by Hanna-Barbera, originally airing in primetime from 1962 to 1963 on ABC, with new episodes airing in first-run syndication from 1985 to 1987. It was Hanna-Barbera's Space Age counterpart to The Flintstones.

Series overview

Episodes

Season 1 (1962–63) 
In the original closing credits, George came home and tried to walk Astro, the family dog, but when Astro noticed a cat by the electronic dog walk, he began to chase it, and George got caught into the dog-walk which begins going too fast. After jumping to safety on a wall Astro and the cat both looked on as George is trapped on the out of control dog walker running for his life while crying out "Jane, stop this crazy thing! Help! JANE!"  This was a counterpart to The Flintstones closing credits in which the saber-toothed cat Baby Puss puts Fred Flintstone out for the night. This ending was parodied in an episode each of Animaniacs, The Adventures of Jimmy Neutron: Boy Genius, Family Guy, Clarence, and Jim Henson's Muppet Babies.

Season 1 contained a laugh track, which was removed when the episodes were released for syndication in 1985. The syndicated episodes were also "updated" with a re-recorded theme song, episode title cards, and a new closing sequence (see "Season 2," below). The title cards and the closing sequence featured the character of Orbitty, who did not appear in any of the original episodes.

The 24 episodes from the 1960s were released to DVD in Region 1 in May 2004 with the laugh track, original closing sequence, and original opening theme intact. However, the DVD release still featured the 1980s "Orbitty" title cards, and the original Flintstones-style teaser intros were not reinstated. (The versions of "The Space Car" and "The Coming of Astro" available on Amazon Video on Demand retain the original opening teasers.)

Rosie the Robot's name was sometimes spelled "Rosey," especially after the 1985 revival series when it appeared on the added title card for episode one. This episode did not have a title card when it aired in 1962. The "Rosie" spelling appeared on the 1962 original soundtrack album containing the first episode, as well as the largest percentage of merchandise and printed material, although there were some that also spelled it "Rosey."

Season 2 (1985) 
 For the 1980s incarnation of the show, new characters were introduced, including Orbitty (the Jetson family's alien pet) and Spacely's inventive nephew Orwell. George's work computer R.U.D.I. (the "Referential Universal Digital Indexer"), who appeared in one 1960s episode, was reintroduced.
 The opening credits featured a rerecorded version of The Jetsons theme song, which features the use of electronic drums to create percussion typical of 1980s music.
 The closing credits are static picture captions (like most of Hanna-Barbera's shows of the time). This format replaced the original credit sequence described above when the 1960s episodes were rebroadcast.

Season 3 (1987)

References

External links 
 
 
 
 

Episodes
Lists of American children's animated television series episodes
Lists of American science fiction television series episodes
Lists of American sitcom episodes